Gordon Stratton (born October 4, 1934) was a Canadian ice hockey right winger who recording 474 goals and 502 assists for 976 points as a pro. Stratton was born in Winnipeg, Manitoba, Canada.

Awards and achievements
MJHL Goal Scoring Leader (1954)
MJHL Co-Scoring Champion (1955)
MJHL First Team Allstar (1955)
EHL Championship (1965)
"Honoured Member" of the Manitoba Hockey Hall of Fame

External links

Gordon Stratton’s biography at Manitoba Hockey Hall of Fame

Canadian ice hockey right wingers
Ice hockey people from Manitoba
Living people
1934 births
Winnipeg Barons players